Stan Walters was a New Zealand rugby league footballer who represented New Zealand.

Playing career
Walters played for the North Shore club and represented Auckland.

He made his debut for New Zealand in 1913 on their tour of Australia. No test matches were played on the tour. Walters made his test debut against the 1914 touring Great Britain Lions.

After the war Walters resumed his New Zealand career, playing for the side between 1919 and 1921. In 1920 he captained New Zealand in a three match test series against Great Britain.

In 1921 he moved into the Waikato region and was involved in coaching and playing up until 1926. He in fact joined the local competition that season as a player and after an appearance for the City Rovers side based in Hamilton was selected for the New Zealand tour of Australia. The newly formed South Auckland league presented him with a medal for being the first ever South Auckland player to be selected for a New Zealand tour.

References

New Zealand rugby league players
New Zealand national rugby league team players
Auckland rugby league team players
North Shore Albions players
New Zealand national rugby league team captains
Rugby league props
Rugby league second-rows
Place of birth missing
Year of death missing
Place of death missing
1889 births